(born 1971 in Amami Ōshima) is a Japanese science fiction writer.

He debuted by self-publishing the e-book version of Gene Mapper in 2012, which was the top of the amazon.co.jp's Best of 2012 Kindle Books in Novel and Literature division.  The revised version was published by Hayakawa Publishing in 2013.

He was the chair of Science Fiction and Fantasy Writers of Japan in 2015–2018.

Awards

 2015: Nihon SF Taisho for Orbital Cloud
 2015: Seiun Award Japanese Long Form for Orbital Cloud

Works

English translations, long form

 Gene Mapper (2015), translation of Gene Mapper —full build— (2013)
 Orbital Cloud (2017), translation of Orbital Cloud (2014)

English translations, short form

 Hello, World! (ハロー・ワールド), chapter excerpt translated by Reiko Seri and Doc Kane. Kobe, Japan, Maplopo, 2020.

Notes

External links

 
 Maplopo | Taiyo Fujii "Hello, World!" (chapter excerpt In English)

1971 births
People from the Amami Islands
Writers from Kagoshima Prefecture
Japanese science fiction writers
Living people